Josef Hoflehner (born 1955) is an Austrian photographer known for his dramatic black-and-white landscape and subtle color images. He is also known for his "Jet Airliner" series—mostly high-key photographs of people on Maho Beach on the Caribbean island of St. Maarten, overshadowed by low-flying passenger planes taking off and landing at Princess Juliana International Airport. He was voted Nature Photographer of the Year 2007, and named as one of "Austria's 10 Best Contemporary Artists" in 2014.

Photobooks 
 Southern Ocean (2002)
 Frozen History (2003)
 Gegendum (2004)
 Unleashed (2005)
 Yemen (2006)
 Iceland (2006)
 Unleashed Two (2007)
 Big Island (2008)
 Li River (2008)
 Nine 9 (2008)
 China (2009)
 Jet Airliner. Wels, Austria: Most, 2009. .
 Unleashed 3 (2010)
 ZNZ: Zanzibar (2011)
 Jet Airliner: the Complete Works. Wels, Austria: Most, 2012. .

Exhibitions
Frozen History, Atlas Gallery, London, 2006
Sublime, Stephen Cohen Gallery, Los Angeles, 2010

References

External links
 Josef Hoflehner's Official Website
 Josef Hoflehner BBC Online Exhibition

1955 births
Living people
Austrian photographers
Photography in Iceland
Nature photographers